Giannis Sotirakos (born 19 January 1995) is a Greek professional footballer who plays as a centre-back for Super League 2 club Kifisia.

References

1995 births
Living people
Greece youth international footballers
Super League Greece players
Football League (Greece) players
Super League Greece 2 players
Niki Volos F.C. players
PAS Lamia 1964 players
Acharnaikos F.C. players
Panachaiki F.C. players
Association football defenders
Footballers from Athens
Greek footballers
Olympiacos F.C. players